Malvern Gardens is a small, upper-middle class neighborhood in the West End of Richmond, Virginia.

External links 
 Boundaries of Malvern Gardens

Neighborhoods in Richmond, Virginia